(born July 25, 1961) is a Japanese professional wrestler and later wrestling trainer, who wrestled under the name .  She is widely considered one of the greatest female wrestlers of all time, and, during her heyday in the early 1980s, was considered one of the best wrestlers in the world, irrespective of gender.

Career 
Yokota was born on July 25, 1961, in Tokyo, Japan.  She spent the majority of her career as a headliner for the All Japan Women's promotion (AJW).  It was highlighted by two title runs as the WWWA World Single Champion.

All Japan Women's Pro Wrestling (1977–1986) 
Having been inspired to join AJW by 1970s stars, the Beauty Pair (Jackie Sato and Maki Ueda), Yokota debuted on June 28, 1977, in Tokyo at the age of 15, against Mayumi Takahashi.  She won her first belt on January 4, 1980, when she became the AJW Junior Champion.  Later that year, she won the WWWA World Tag Team Championship with Ayumi Hori, on December 17, having also become the first AJW Champion with a victory over Nancy Kumi two days earlier.  On February 25, 1981, she achieved her greatest success to that point, defeating her original inspiration, Jackie Sato, for the WWWA World Single Championship.  She was 19 years old at the time of her first title reign.

She lost her first world championship to La Galactica on May 7, 1983, in a mask vs. hair match, then won it back a month later.  During her second world title run, she had very notable feuds with Devil Masami and Lioness Asuka (of the Crush Gals), but had to vacate the championship in 1985 due to a shoulder injury.

Retirement (1986–1995) 
After her early retirement in 1986 (she was 24), she became a trainer for AJW.  Notable students of hers include Manami Toyota, Toshiyo Yamada, Megumi Kudo, Kyoko Inoue, and Takako Inoue.

On November 20, 1994, Yokota returned from retirement to wrestle at Big Egg Wrestling Universe. She teamed with Bison Kimura and went to a 10-minute time limit draw against Lioness Asuka and Yumi Ogura. According to Yokota, this inspired her to return to wrestling full-time.

Jd' (1995–1998) 
In 1995 she came out of retirement to form her promotion Jd', and wrestled as its top star until 1998, when she retired for a second time.

Retirement (1998–2004) 
Yokota stayed retired from 1998 to 2004, as she started to have a family.

Freelance (2004–present) 
Yokota was married in August 2004 to the lead vocalist for the obscure but seminal 1980s Hokkaido based hardcore band "Tranquilizer". She has since returned to professional wrestling as a freelancer, including a stint as part of the Monster faction in Hustle as Jaguar Y.

Championships and accomplishments 
All Japan Women's Pro-Wrestling
AJW Championship (1 time)
AJW Junior Championship (1 time)
WWWA World Single Championship (2 times)
WWWA World Tag Team Championship (1 time) – with Jumbo Hori
AJW Hall of Fame (1998)

JDStar
AWF World Women's Championship (1 time)
TWF World Women's Championship] (1 time)
TWF World Tag Team Championship (1 time) – with Yuko Kosugi

Universal Wrestling Association
UWA World Women's Championship (1 time)

World Woman Pro-Wrestling Diana
WWWD World Elizabeth Championship (2 times, current)
WWWD World Tag Team Championship (1 time) – with Sareee

Wrestling Observer Newsletter awards
Wrestling Observer Newsletter Hall of Fame (Class of 1996)

References

Sources 

Molinaro, John F. Top 100 Pro Wrestlers of All Time, Winding Stair Press, 2002, page 166.

Japanese female professional wrestlers
Professional wrestling trainers
1961 births
Living people
Sportspeople from Tokyo
20th-century professional wrestlers
21st-century professional wrestlers